Mägo de Oz (La Bruja), also known as Mägo de Oz: La Bruja or simply La Bruja, is an album by folk metal artists Mägo de Oz, which was released in 1997.

It includes five tracks from the original release, redone with the current band members. The title is not actually La Bruja - it is self-titled - but that is the name it acquired due to the witch (bruja in Spanish) on the cover. The album is currently labelled La Bruja on the band's official website.

Track listing
"El Lago" (The Lake) - 4:25
"T'esnucaré contra'l Bidé" (I Will Break Your Spine Against the Bidet) - 4:19
"El Hijo del Blues" (The Son of the Blues) - 4:45
"Gerdundula" - 1:48 [cover of Status Quo]
"Mägo de Oz" (Wizard of Oz) - 10:43

1997 albums
Mägo de Oz albums
Locomotive Music albums

es:La bruja#Música